is a Japanese manga series written by Haruka Fukushima. It was serialized in the shōjo manga magazine Nakayoshi from 2004 to 2007. All three volumes have been released in North America by Tokyopop. The story revolves around the relationship between a boy, Haruki Sugimoto, and a girl, Konatsu Narumiya. Haruki is forced by urges to change genders at night, turning into Haruko. While his alter-ego takes over, the urges to flirt with Konatsu completely take over even as he is a girl.

Plot 

The series Kedamono Damono's plot line follows a young highschool girl named Konatsu as we see her chaotic circumstances. Konatsu is the manager of the basketball team at her school and has a crush on the teams captain, however its just her luck that he ends up being a complete jerk. After confiding in another team member named Haruki, about her troubles they start to better understand each other, this causes Konastu to learn the Haruki that he is a cool and ordinary boy by day, but a perv girl by night.

References

Further reading

External links
 Kedamono Damono official website at TOKYOPOP
 

Kodansha manga
Romantic comedy anime and manga
Shōjo manga
Yuri (genre) anime and manga